Mitromorpha engli is a species of sea snail, a marine gastropod mollusk in the family Mitromorphidae. It is found around the Canary Islands. The length of the shell varies between 4 mm and 5 mm.

References

 Mifsud, C., 2001 The genus Mitromorpha Carpenter, 1865 and its subgenera with European species, p. 32 pp

Further reading
 

engli
Gastropods described in 2001